The Shevlin Stakes was an American Thoroughbred horse race for three-year-olds run at Aqueduct Racetrack in Queens, New York and at Belmont Park in Elmont, New York. The race on dirt was inaugurated in 1925 to honor the long service of James Shevlin, the President of the Queens County Jockey Club which operated Aqueduct Racetrack  who had died at age 82 on November 24, 1924, at his home in Brooklyn.

There was no race run from 1933 through 1935.

Records
Speed record:
  1:36.80 - Volitant (1959) (1 mile)
  1:42.80 - Jacomar (1940) ( miles - race and track record)
  1:22.40 - Clem -  (7 furlongs)

Most wins by a jockey:
 5 - Ted Atkinson (1943, 1944, 1945, 1947, 1950)

Most wins by a trainer:
 5 - James E. Fitzsimmons (1931, 1932, 1941, 1952, 1954)

Most wins by an owner:
 3 - Belair Stud (1931, 1932, 1952)

Winners

References

Discontinued horse races in New York (state)
Flat horse races for three-year-olds
Aqueduct Racetrack
Belmont Park